Finnish Italians are Finns who speak Italian, were born in Italy or are children of Italian immigrants. The number of Italians can only be measured in the number of Italian speakers, people born in Italy and their children, since Finland doesn't collect statistics on ethnicity.

Demographics
67% of Finnish Italians are male and 33% are female. 51.3% of Finnish Italians are employed, 9.5% are unemployed and 39.2% are outside the labour force. There are over 200 Italian students in Finland, and over 160 Italian entrepreneurs. 761 Italian men are in a registered relationship with a Finnish woman.

In 2018:
1,133 Finns had a dual Italian citizenship
2,441 Finns had an Italian background
2,709 Finns had an Italian citizenship
2,857 Finns spoke Italian as their native language
2,956 Finns were born in Italy

Italian organizations in Finland
There are two prominent Italian organizations in Finland: Italialaisten yhdistys Suomessa -järjestö, established in 1990 and Finlandia-Italia r.y - kulttuuriseura, which was established in 1963.

Notable Finnish Italians

 Marco Matrone, footballer
 Charles Bassi, architect
 Lauri Dalla Valle, former footballer
 Marco Parnela, former footballer
 Antonio Inutile, footballer
 Anna Falchi, model and actress
 Marco Casagrande, architect
 Manuela Bosco, actress
 Clara Petrozzi, violist
 Monica Sileoni, retired artistic gymnast
 Janna Hurmerinta, singer
 Maarit Hurmerinta, singer and musician
 Andreas Bernard, ice hockey goaltender
 Eugenio Giraldoni, operatic baritone
 Sara Negri, mathematical logician 
 Egle Oddo, visual artist

See also 
 Finland–Italy relations

References

Ethnic groups in Finland
 
Finland
Finland–Italy relations